No Fun may refer to:

 "No Fun" (The Stooges song), a song by The Stooges on their 1969 album The Stooges
 "No Fun" (Joji song), a song by Joji on his 2018 album Ballads 1
 "No Fun" (Incubus song), a song by Incubus on their 2017 album 8
 The No Fun EP by Local H, 2003